Damián Álvarez Arcos (born March 11, 1973) is a Mexican former footballer who played as a forward.

Club career
A mobile striker able to play up front or on the flank, Álvarez began his career with Atlas in 1991, moving to León in 1995. By the 1995–1996 season, he had broken into the first team at León, scoring 6 goals in 27 matches. In 1997, he had a short spell in Major League Soccer with the Dallas Burn, scoring 11 goals in 19 matches as the Burn reached the MLS playoffs. Between the 1997 and 1998 MLS seasons he had a brief spell at Chivas before returning to Dallas in 1998. After scoring 4 times in 13 games in 1998, Álvarez was traded to the New England Revolution in exchange for Colombian Oscar Pareja, appeared only twice for New England, and left MLS after the season. Returning to Mexico, he joined Club América and later represented Pachuca, Atlante, Toluca, and San Luis, but never again made more than five starts in a top-flight season. His last match at top level came with San Luis in 2002.

International career
Álvarez was also a member of the Mexico national football team. He represented Mexico at the 1991 FIFA World Youth Championship, scoring a goal against Sweden and later competed at the 1992 Summer Olympics in Barcelona, Spain. He earned six caps for the national A-side, making his debut on September 15, 1996, in a World Cup Qualifier against St. Vincent & the Grenadines (0-3 win) in Kingston, Jamaica, substituting Cuauhtémoc Blanco in the 81st minute and scoring in the closing minutes. Álvarez also scored in his final international match, a 3–1 victory over Ecuador on February 5, 1997.

References

External links

FIFA

1973 births
Living people
Footballers from Veracruz
Association football forwards
Mexican footballers
Mexico international footballers
Mexico under-20 international footballers
Olympic footballers of Mexico
Footballers at the 1992 Summer Olympics
Atlas F.C. footballers
Club León footballers
Club Atlético Zacatepec players
FC Dallas players
C.D. Guadalajara footballers
New England Revolution players
C.F. Pachuca players
Venados F.C. players
Atlante F.C. footballers
Deportivo Toluca F.C. players
San Luis F.C. players
Major League Soccer players
Mexican expatriate footballers
Mexican expatriate sportspeople in the United States
Expatriate soccer players in the United States
Liga MX players